The London 10,000 is an annual road running event over  which takes place in late May in London, United Kingdom. Established in 2008, the race goes through the roads of St. James's Park and finishes on the mall by Buckingham Palace. VitalityHealth took over sponsorship in 2016 from the original sponsor BUPA.

It has become one of the most popular mass participation 10k runs in the United Kingdom. In 2008, over 12,500 runners took part, with 8372 recorded finishers for the 2009 event. It is managed by the same organisers as the London Marathon.

Mo Farah is a seven-time winner of the men's race and his course record of 27:44 minutes in 2010 was ratified as the British record for the 10K road distance. The women's record of 31:06 minutes was also set in 2010, by Kenya's Mary Keitany.

Elite race winners

Key:

References

External links

Official website

10K runs
Tourist attractions in the City of Westminster
Recurring sporting events established in 2008
Athletics in London
Athletics competitions in England
Road running in the United Kingdom
2008 establishments in England
Annual sporting events in the United Kingdom